This is a list of airports in Vanuatu, sorted by location.

Airports 

Airport names shown in bold indicate the airport has scheduled commercial airline service.

See also 
 Transport in Vanuatu
 List of airports by ICAO code: N#NV - Vanuatu
 Wikipedia: WikiProject Aviation/Airline destination lists: Oceania#Vanuatu

References
 
  - includes IATA codes
Great Circle Mapper - IATA and ICAO codes
World Aero Data - ICAO codes

External links

 
Vanuatu
Vanuatu
Airports